Mark Aanderud (born 1976) is a Mexican pianist, composer, arranger, producer and conductor.

Aanderud started piano studies at 8 years old at the Escuela Nacional de Musica in Mexico City. He started to perform professionally when he was 18 years old. Aanderud is known as a jazz pianist and composer, but through the years he has also performed, composed and recorded in several genres from Jazz and classical music to progressive rock and Latin music. His first CD as a leader, Mark Aanderud Trio 02, was awarded best jazz album of the year 2003 by the Czech Music Awards.

In recent years, Aanderud has toured with international artists including the Mexican singer-songwriter and actress Ximena Sariñana and the Omar Rodriguez-Lopez Group. Aanderud has also recorded additional piano parts with The Mars Volta for their 2009 release Octahedron.

Discography 

With The Mars Volta
 Octahedron (2009)

With Stomu Takeishi, Hernán Hecht
 RGB (RareNoise Records, 2014)

With the Omar Rodriguez-Lopez Group
Los Sueños de un Higado (2009)
 Xenophanes (2009)
 Woman Gives Birth To Tomato! (2013)
 Doom Patrol (2017)

References

 Ozuna, Tony: "Hip Homecoming", The Prague Post, 2010-01-13.

Living people
1976 births
Mexican jazz musicians
Mexican jazz pianists
21st-century pianists
RareNoiseRecords artists